Süleyman's Tower (also called "armed Ayas tower") is a historical building in Yumurtalık district of Adana Province, Turkey.
The tower is situated at the Mediterranean Sea side to the west of Yumurtalık.

The building was an observation tower built in 1536 during the reign of Ottoman sultan Süleyman I (called "the Magnificent").  The  pentagonal two storey building was built to observe the sea to protect the busy port of Ayas, Adana from a possible pirate assault.

References

Buildings and structures in Adana Province
Buildings and structures of the Ottoman Empire
Yumurtalık